Lilbourne is a village and civil parish in West Northamptonshire in England. It is close to the M1 motorway which runs east of the village, and the A5 road, west of the village which marks the boundary with Warwickshire, slightly to the north is the River Avon which marks the boundary with Leicestershire (the three counties meeting at Dow Bridge). At the time of the 2001 census, the parish's population was 254 people, increasing to 273 at the 2011 Census, and further to 305 at the 2021 census.

History
The villages name means 'Lilla's stream'. Alternatively, the first element might be a stream-name, Lille.

Just outside Lilbourne is the River Avon and the remains of a Norman motte-and-bailey castle. To the west of the castle is the local church, All Saints, which is Grade I listed building dating from the 12th century. A, smaller, motte and bailey castle lies 0.9 km to the north west of the village, at Lilbourne Gorse.

No. 73 Squadron RAF was stationed at nearby RAF Lilbourne during World War I. Lilbourne once had a railway station on the former London and North Western Railway line from Rugby to Market Harborough which closed in 1966 - one of hundreds of rural stations and lines which were closed by the Beeching Axe. The station was situated away from the main part of the village, in fact across the River Avon county border, just within the parish of Catthorpe, Leicestershire.

Amenities
Greenhaven Woodland Burial Ground, the first privately owned natural burial ground in the UK, is in Lilbourne.
As with most villages it has its own park which is part of a large Village Hall that is used for Fetes, jumble sales and general meetings as well as private hire events.

References

Villages in Northamptonshire
West Northamptonshire District
Civil parishes in Northamptonshire